Leo VI (or Leon VI, notably in Greek) may refer to :

 Leo VI the Wise, Byzantine emperor 886 to 912
 Pope Leo VI, 928 to 929
 King Leo VI of Armenia (1342 – 1393), of the House of Lusignan, last Latin king of the Armenian crusader Kingdom of Cilicia (in Anatolia)